The Mangaone River is a river of the Manawatū-Whanganui Region of New Zealand's North Island.

See also
List of rivers of New Zealand

References

Rivers of Manawatū-Whanganui
Rivers of New Zealand